Platycheirus varipes (the silver sedgesitter, commonly flower fly) is a rare species of syrphid fly observed in Northern Europe: Norway, Sweden, Finland; Greenland; central Asiatic Russia; and in North America from Alaska and Canada south to Colorado, via mountain chains.

Hoverflies can remain nearly motionless in flight. Adult Platycheirus varipes are also known as flower flies for they are commonly found on flowers from which they get both energy-giving nectar and protein rich pollen. Larvae are aphid predators.

References

Diptera of North America
Hoverflies of North America
Syrphinae
Insects described in 1923